The 1947 Partition Archive is a 501(c)(3) nonprofit oral history organization in Berkeley, California and a registered trust in Delhi, India, that collects, preserves and shares firsthand accounts of the Partition of India in 1947. The organization started in 2010 when Dr. Guneeta Singh Bhalla began recording video interviews with elder Partition witnesses throughout the San Francisco Bay Area, and was formalized in 2011. The creation of the 1947 Partition Archive was inspired by the Hiroshima Peace Memorial and the work of various Holocaust memorials.

The 1947 Partition Archive crowd-sources the collection of Partition witness interviews and conducts free classes, in the form of an online Oral History Workshop, to train volunteers in story-collection and interviewing techniques. As of January 2020, over 9,140 interviews have been collected from more than 450 cities and villages in 14 countries including India, Pakistan, Bangladesh, United States, United Kingdom and Israel among others. The 1947 Partition Archive's methods of crowd-sourcing story collection include Story Scholars, a fellowship program in which individuals are chosen based on academic merit and prior experience to conduct interviews in a selected region, and Citizen Historians, a program in which volunteers can contribute Partition stories to the organization's website.

The website of the 1947 Partition Archive includes a Story Map that shows the migration patterns of each interviewee. Given the sensitive relationship between Partition stories and Hindu–Muslim relations, only a small portion of the 1947 Partition Archive's collection has been released to the public in edited form. Currently, access to the stories is granted on a case-by-case to scholars for academic research.

See also
Opposition to the partition of India
Violence against women during the partition of India

References

External links
  The 1947 Partition Archive website

Organizations based in Berkeley, California
Partition of India
2010 establishments in California